Honestly, Nevermind is the seventh studio album by Canadian rapper and singer Drake, which was surprise-released on June 17, 2022, through OVO Sound and Republic Records. The album includes a sole guest feature from 21 Savage, and production from a variety of producers, including Gordo, Black Coffee, and frequent collaborator 40. 

A stylistic departure from Drake's previous releases, Honestly, Nevermind adopts a dance, house and Baltimore club sound. The album received generally positive reviews and debuted atop the US Billboard 200 with 204,000 album-equivalent units. It became Drake's eleventh US number-one album. The album's singles, "Sticky" and "Massive", debuted in the top 20 in the US Billboard Hot 100, while "Jimmy Cooks" became Drake's eleventh (and 21 Savage's second) US number-one song.

Background and promotion
On March 4, 2021, Drake announced the launch of satellite radio channel Sound 42 on Sirius XM, with OVO Sound Radio as its flagship program, marking the show's return since it aired between July 2015 and October 2018 on streaming service Apple Music. Following the show's broadcast, he released his fourth extended play Scary Hours 2 at midnight. Drake also revealed that his sixth studio album Certified Lover Boy would be coming soon, which was eventually released on September 3.

A few hours later, Drake made a surprise announcement on Instagram that he would be releasing his seventh studio album, Honestly, Nevermind, later that midnight. Broadcasting not long after Game Six of the 2022 NBA Finals earlier that night, Drake premiered the tracks "Confusion" and "I Don't Care" on the show. Drake also revealed during the show that he was working on Scary Hours 3.

The album is dedicated to American fashion designer Virgil Abloh, who died in 2021. A music video for "Falling Back" was released alongside the album. Directed by Director X, the official music video sees Drake marrying 23 different women. Canadian-American professional basketball player Tristan Thompson makes an appearance as his best man.

The album's only feature, 21 Savage, appears on the closing track of the album, "Jimmy Cooks". The album's first two singles, "Sticky" and "Massive" were sent to rhythmic contemporary radio and contemporary hit radio, respectively, on June 21. "Jimmy Cooks" impacted contemporary hit radio on October 11, as the album's third single.

Composition
Honestly, Nevermind is a dance album driven by house and Baltimore club influences. The album includes elements of Jersey club, hard techno, R&B, amapiano, ballroom, and Drake's traditional style of hip hop.

Critical reception

Honestly, Nevermind was met with generally positive reviews. At Metacritic, which assigns a normalized rating out of 100 to reviews from professional publications, the album received an average score of 73, based on 14 reviews, indicating "generally favorable reviews". Aggregator AnyDecentMusic? gave it 6.7 out of 10, based on their assessment of the critical consensus.

In a positive review, Robin Murray of Clash called Honestly, Nevermind a "puzzle that will take a long time to fully unlock" and "a devastating about-turn that will fascinate and frustrate in equal measure". Tim Sendra from AllMusic enjoyed the album, saying, "Honestly, Nevermind is a welcome development in the Drake saga, a left turn off what was starting to seem like an endless stretch of trap-heavy highway. The destination is still sad and self-involved, but at least the scenery is colorful and never boring". The New York Timess Jon Caramanica wrote, "A small marvel of bodily exuberance – appealingly weightless, escapist and zealously free. An album of entrancing club music, it's a pointed evolution toward a new era for one of music's most influential stars. It is also a Drake album made up almost wholly of the parts of Drake albums that send hip-hop purists into conniptions". Writing for Rolling Stone, Jeff Ihaza stated, "The album achieves something mischievously unguarded: a collection of blissful dance tunes constructed for embrace and abandon. Drake takes a leap further into uncharted realms than any of his peers, offering a refreshing sign of what's to come".

Vivian Medithi of HipHopDX said, "He stopped making the Drake album we want him to make and made the Drake album Drake wants to make. Locked in with producers he trusts and letting his guard down, he sounds more focused and balanced than he has in years". Variety critic Alex Swhear said, "As a standalone Drake album, it's deeply refreshing, and a dose of vibrant pop likely to reverberate through the remainder of the summer". Louis Pavlakos of Exclaim! said, "Hints of the album's atypicality are apparent from its opening minutes, for better or worse. "Falling Back" makes for a questionable lead-off, as Drake's falsetto has never been particularly strong, but Honestly, Nevermind rarely falters from there".

In a lukewarm review, Pitchforks Alphonse Pierre wrote, "A breezy Drake dance album sounds great in concept, but the half-measure house beats and lackluster songwriting keep it from really popping off". In his review, Alexis Petridis of The Guardian states, "The Canadian superstar's new album is surprisingly full of house music, but his passive-aggressive complaints get dull". NME critic Kyann-Sian Williams said, "The Canadian's latest release surprises in many ways, ditching bland trap for house beats and some daring, if somewhat mixed, vocal takes". In a more negative review, David Smyth of Evening Standard opined that Honestly, Nevermind felt like "a minor work" within Drake's discography, going on to say that "[Drake] sounds like he isn't trying very hard".

Year-end lists

In popular culture
The song "Texts Go Green" was used by Google in an Android advertisement to call on Apple Inc. to adopt Rich Communication Services (RCS), in reference to the song's premise of iPhone users being blocked on iMessage.

Commercial performance
Honestly, Nevermind debuted at number one on the US Billboard 200 with 204,000 album-equivalent units, including 11,000 pure album sales. Its tracks earned a total of 250.23 million on-demand streams. The album is Drake's eleventh number-one album in the US. In its second week, the album remained in the top ten as it fell to number three, earning 73,000 album-equivalent units.

Track listing

Notes
  signifies a co-producer
  signifies an additional producer

Sample credits
 "Currents" contains samples of "Some Cut", written by Jonathan Smith, Donnell Prince, Lawrence Edwards, Jamal Glaze, Craig Love, LaMarquis Jefferson, as performed by Trillville, and also contains an uncredited sample of "Shake it to the Ground", written by Charles Smith and Ryeisha Berrain, as performed by Blaqstarr and Rye Rye.
 "Calling My Name" contains uncredited samples of "Oye Ohene", written and performed by Obrafour.
 "Sticky" contains uncredited dialogue from Virgil Abloh's 2017 "Everything in Quotes" lecture at Columbia University's GSAPP.
 "Flight's Booked" contains samples of "Getting Late", written by Marsha Ambrosius, Natalie Stewart, and Vidal Davis, as performed by Floetry.
 "Jimmy Cooks" contains samples of "Just Awaken Shaken", written by Ibn Young, as performed by Playa Fly; and also contains samples of "You Were Gone" written by Al Goodman, Harry Ray, and Walter Morris, as performed by Brook Benton.

Personnel
Musicians
 Drake – vocals
 Mukengerwa Tresor Riziki – additional vocals (track 4, 11, 12), background vocals (9)
 Wondra030 – piano (5)
 Alex Lustig – keyboards (6, 10)
 Beau Nox – guitar (6, 10), additional vocals (9) background vocals (10, 11)
 Emily Hemelberg – background vocals (10)
 Black Coffee – drums (10)
 James Bryan – guitar (10)
 40 – keyboards (10)
 Nyan Lieberthal – drums, keyboards (13)
 Tim Suby – keyboards (13)
 Dougie F – background vocals (14)

Technical
 40 – mixing (all tracks), engineering (4, 5, 8, 13)
 Luca Pretolesi – mixing
 Noel Cadastre – engineering (1–)
 Harley Arsenault – engineering (6)

Charts

Weekly charts

Year-end charts

Certifications

Release history

References

2022 albums
Drake (musician) albums
Republic Records albums
OVO Sound albums
Albums in memory of deceased persons
House music albums by Canadian artists
Albums produced by Tay Keith
Albums produced by Cubeatz
Albums produced by 40 (record producer)
Albums produced by Vinylz
Baltimore club albums